Donald L. Woodland (23 May 1930 – 15 January 1994) is a former member of the Ohio Senate.  He served the 16th District, which encompassed portions of Franklin County.  He served from 1973 to 1976, and was succeeded by Michael Schwarzwalder.

References

1930 births
Democratic Party Ohio state senators
Politicians from Columbus, Ohio
1994 deaths
20th-century American politicians